Isometopinae is a subfamily of jumping tree bugs in the family Miridae and are the only members of the Miridae to possess ocelli. The subfamily is split into five tribes. There are 42 genera and approximately 239 described species in Isometopinae.

Genera
These six genera belong to the subfamily Isometopinae:
 Corticoris McAtee & Malloch, 1922
 Diphleps Bergroth, 1924
 Lidopus Gibson, 1917
 Myiomma Puton, 1872
 Wetmorea McAtee and Malloch, 1924
Myiopus Henry 1980

References

Further reading

 
 
 
 
 
 
 
 
 
 

Miridae